The Ancaster Avalanche were a Canadian junior ice hockey team based in Ancaster, Ontario.  They played in the Golden Horseshoe Conference of the Greater Ontario Junior Hockey League. The team was known as the Stoney Creek Warriors prior to 2013.  In 2018, they relocated to become the Hamilton Kilty B's.

History
The Warriors were formed in 1974 as a member of the Niagara & District Junior C Hockey League.  As a Junior C team, the Warriors would win four league titles.  The Warriors moved up to the Golden Horseshoe Junior B Hockey League in 1994 under the name Spirit.

In the Summer of 2013, the team was relocated to Ancaster, Ontario and renamed the Avalanche.  On September 7, 2013, hockey officially returned to Ancaster, as the Avalanche hosted the Buffalo Regals in their season opener and defeated them 10-3.  In 2016 the Avalanche became an affiliate of the OHL Hamilton Bulldogs.

Season-by-season results

Sutherland Cup appearances
2009: Brantford Eagles defeated Stoney Creek Warriors 4-games-to-1

External links
Avalanche Webpage
GOJHL Webpage

Golden Horseshoe Junior B Hockey League teams